George Rithe (1523–1561) was MP for Petersfield from October 1553 to April 1554, and then again from 1559 until his death.

A lawyer, he was from Northington.

References

1523 births
1561 deaths
People from Petersfield
English MPs 1553 (Mary I)
English MPs 1559
People from the City of Winchester